Positive youth development (PYD) programs are designed to optimize youth developmental progress. Youth.gov states that "PYD is an intentional, prosocial approach that engages youth within their communities, schools, organizations, peer groups, and families in a manner that is productive and constructive; recognizes, utilizes, and enhances young people’s strengths; and promotes positive outcomes for young people by providing opportunities, fostering positive relationships, and furnishing the support needed to build on their leadership strengths."

PYD differs from other approaches to youth in that it rejects an emphasis on trying to correct what is considered wrong with children's behavior or development. Instead, youth development professionals live by the motto originally coined by Karen Pittman, "problem free is not fully prepared" as they work to grow youth into productive members of society. Moreover, seen through a PYD lens, young people are not regarded as "problems to be solved;" rather, they are seen as assets, allies, and agents of change who have much to contribute in solving the problems that affect them the most. Programs and practitioners seek to empathize with, educate, and engage children in productive activities. Though the field is still growing, PYD has been used across the world to address social divisions, such as gender and ethnic differences.

Background
Positive youth development originated from ecological systems theory to focus on the strengths of adolescents. It is also similar conceptually with the principles of positive psychology. Central to its philosophy, the theory of PYD suggests that "if young people have mutually beneficial relations with the people and institutions of their social world, they will be on the way to a hopeful future marked by positive contributions to self, family, community, and civil society."

The major catalyst for the development of positive youth development came as a response to the negative and punitive methods of the "traditional youth development" approach. The traditional approach makes a connection between the changes occurring during adolescent years and either the beginning or peaking of several important public health and social problems, including homicide, suicide, substance use and abuse, sexually transmitted infections and teen and unplanned pregnancies. Another aspect of the traditional approach lies in that many professionals and mass media contribute to it through the portrayal of adolescents as inevitable problems that simply need to be fixed. Specific evidence of this "problem-centered" model is present across professional fields that deal with young people. Many connections can also be made to the current U.S. criminal justice model that favors punishment as opposed to prevention.

The concept and practice of positive youth development "grew from the dissatisfaction with a predominant view that underestimated the true capacities of young people by focusing on their deficits rather than their development potential." Encouraging the positive development of adolescents can help to lessen the likelihood of such problems arising by easing a healthy transition into adulthood. Research findings point out that PYD provides a sense of “social belonging” or “social membership,” participatory motivation in academic-based and community activities for positive educational outcomes, developing a sense of social responsibility and civic engagement, participating in organized activities that would aid in self-development, etc.

Goals
PYD focuses on the active promotion of optimal human development, rather than on the scientific study of age related change, distinguishing it from the study of child development or adolescent development. or as solely a means of avoiding risky behaviors. Rather than grounding its developmental approach in the presence of adversity, risk or challenge, a PYD approach considers the potential and capacity of each individual young person.  A hallmark of these programs is that they are based on the concept that children and adolescents have strengths and abilities unique to their developmental stage and that they are not merely "inadequate" or "undeveloped" adults. Lerner and colleagues write: "The goal of the positive youth development perspective is to promote positive outcomes. This idea is in contrast to a perspective that focuses on punishment and the idea that adolescents are broken".

Positive youth development is both a vision, an ideology and a new vocabulary for engaging with youth development.  Its tenets can be organized into the 5 C's which are: competence, confidence, connection, character, and caring. When these 5 C's are present, the 6th C of "contribution" is realized.

Key features
Positive youth development programs typically recognize contextual variability in youths' experience and in what is considered healthy or optimal development for youth in different settings or cultures. This cultural sensitivity reflects the influence of Bronfenbrenner's ecological systems theory. The influence of ecological systems theory is also seen on the emphasis many youth development programs place on the interrelationship of different social contexts through which the development person moves (e.g. family, peers, school, work, and leisure).

The University of Minnesota's Keys to Quality Youth Development summarizes eight key elements of programs that successfully promote youth development. Such programs are physically and emotionally safe, give youth a sense of belonging and ownership and foster their self-worth, allow them to discover their "selves" (identities, interests, strengths), foster high quality and supportive relations with peers and adults, help youth recognize conflicting values and develop their own, foster the development of new skills, have fun, and have hope for the future.

In addition, programs that employ PYD principles generally have one or more of the following features:
 promote bonding
 foster resilience
 promote social, emotional, cognitive, behavioral, and moral competence
 foster self-determination
 foster spirituality
 foster self-efficacy
 foster clear and positive identity
 foster belief in the future
 provide recognition for positive behavior and opportunities for pro-social involvement
 promote empowerment 
 foster pro-social norms

Using PYD to address stereotypes and inequality

Gender

Positive youth development principles can be used to address gender inequities through the promotion of programs such as "Girls on the Run." Physical activity-based programs like "Girls on the Run" are being increasingly used around the world for their ability to encourage psychological, emotional, and social development for youth. "Girls on the Run" enhances this type of physical activity program by specifically targeting female youth in an effort to reduce the gendered view of a male-dominated sports arena. "Girls on the Run" is a non-profit organization begun in 1996 that distributes a 12-week training program to help girls prepare for a 5k running competition. This particular program is made available to 3rd through 5th grade female students throughout the United States and Canada to be implemented in either school or community-based settings.

Another example of positive youth development principles being used to target youth gender inequities can be seen in that of a participatory diagramming approach in Kibera, Kenya. This community development effort enabled participants to feel safe discussing their concerns regarding gender inequities in the community with the dominant male group. This approach also enabled youth to voice their needs and identify potential solutions related to topics like HIV/AIDS and family violence.

Ethnic minorities in the United States

Positive youth development can be used to combat negative stereotypes surrounding youth of minority ethnic groups in the U.S. After-school programs have been directly geared to generate increased participation for African American and Latino youth with a focus on academic achievement and increasing high school graduation rates. Studies have found programs targeting African American youth are more effective when they work to bolster a sense of their cultural identity. PYD has even been used to help develop and strengthen the cultural identities of American Indian and Alaskan Native youth. PYD methods have been used to provide a supportive setting in which to engage youth in traditional activities. Various programs have been implemented related to sports, language, and arts and crafts.  Sports programs that use positive youth development principles are commonly referred to as "sports-based youth development" (SBYD) programs. SBYD incorporates positive youth development principles into program and curricula design and coach training.

Models of implementation

Asia
The key constructs of PYD listed above have been generally accepted throughout the world with some regional distinctions. For example, a Chinese Positive Youth Development Scale has been developed to conceptualize how these features are applicable to Chinese youth. The Chinese Positive Youth Development Scale was used as a measure in a study of Chinese youth in secondary schools in Hong Kong that indicated positive youth development has a direct impact on life satisfaction and reducing problem behavior for Chinese youth. One specific example of PYD implementation is seen in the project "P.A.T.H.S. (Positive Adolescent Training through Holistic Social Programmes) to Adulthood: A Jockey Club Youth Enhancement Scheme." This program targets junior secondary school students in Hong Kong (Grades 7 through 9 in the North American System). The program is composed of two terms, the first of which is a structured curriculum focusing on the 15 PYD constructs and designed for all students as a "universal prevention initiative." The Tier 2 Program is a more selective prevention model directly targeting students with greater psychosocial needs identified by the school social work service providers. The label "at-risk" is intentionally avoided because the term denotes a very negative stigma in Chinese culture, and therefore discourages participation in the program. Although Chinese social work agencies commonly target students with greater psychosocial needs, these PYD programs have rarely undergone thorough systemic evaluation and documentation.

Europe
In Portugal, the utility of positive youth development principles in sporting contexts is beginning to be recognized. Several athletic-based programs have been implemented in the country, but more research is necessary to determine their effectiveness at this point.

Latin America and the Caribbean
Positive youth development has also been seen in the form of youth volunteer service throughout Latin America and the Caribbean. From Mexico and the Caribbean to Central and South America, this form of implementation has been acknowledged for encouraging both personal and community development, while oftentimes contributing to poverty reduction. It has furthermore been seen as a way of promoting civil engagement through various service opportunities in communities.

Positive youth development efforts can be seen in the work of the United States Agency for International Development (USAID) in collaboration with various regional governments and the private sector across Latin America and the Caribbean. This work has focused on providing broader educational options, skills training, and opportunities for economically disadvantaged youth to obtain apprenticeships. The ¡Supérate! Centers across El Salvador are one example, as they are supported by USAID in combination with private companies and foundations, and offer expanded education for high-performing students from poorer economic backgrounds. As of 2011, there were 7 centers in El Salvador and USAID expressed plans to expand this model across Central America. In Brazil, the Jovem Plus program offers high-demand skills training for youth in disadvantaged communities in Rio de Janeiro and the northeastern area of the nation. Other programs include the "Youth Movement against Violence" in Guatemala and "Youth Upliftment through Employment" in Jamaica.

See also
 Comprehensive sex education
 Culture and positive psychology
Growth mindset
 Positive education

References

External links
 
 
 

Youth